James Harold Bell (born 20 November 1950) is a retired British Anglican bishop. He was the area Bishop of Ripon in the Diocese of Leeds.

Early life
Bell studied modern history at St John's College, Durham (BA 1972). Then began a 10-year residence in Oxford, where from 1972 until 1975 he studied for ordination at Wycliffe Hall, meanwhile matriculating in the University of Oxford as a member of St Peter's Hall, taking a Bachelor of Arts (BA) in Theology in 1974 (having read for the Final Honour School alone) and incepting as an Oxford Master of Arts (MA Oxon) in 1978.

Ordained ministry
Upon his ordination as a deacon in 1975 he was appointed Honorary Curate of Oxford St Michael with St Martin and All Saints and the following year, having been ordained priest, he because Chaplain and Lecturer of Brasenose College until 1982. He held several pastoral posts in West London before moving to the Diocese of Ripon and Leeds in 1997. Initially Director of Mission (and an Honorary Canon of Ripon Cathedral) he was appointed suffragan Bishop of Knaresborough following the death of Frank Weston.

Bell was consecrated a bishop by David Hope, Archbishop of York, during a service at York Minster on 2 March 2004. He was installed as Bishop of Knaresborough at Ripon Cathedral on 14 March 2004.

From 2004 until the creation of the Diocese of Leeds in 2014, Bell was suffragan Bishop of Knaresborough in the Diocese of Ripon and Leeds; upon the dissolution of the Ripon diocese and the erection of the Leeds diocese, Bell became area bishop for the Ripon area. His title remained Bishop of Knaresborough until that See was translated to Ripon (i.e. the title changed to Bishop of Ripon) by Order in Council of 19 March 2015.

On 23 October 2016, it was announced that Bell was to retire effective 30 April 2017.

Styles
The Reverend James Bell (1975–1997)
The Reverend Canon James Bell (1997–2004)
The Right Reverend James Bell (2004–present)

References

External links 
 archived website that contains information about James Bell, as of 23 September 2016

Bishops of Knaresborough
Anglican Diocese of Leeds
1950 births
Living people
Alumni of St John's College, Durham
Alumni of Wycliffe Hall, Oxford
Alumni of St Peter's College, Oxford
Fellows of Brasenose College, Oxford
Bishops of Ripon (modern area bishops)